General elections were held in the Faroe Islands on 6 November 1945. The People's Party remained the largest in the Løgting, winning 11 of the 23 seats.

Results

References

Faroe Islands
1945 in the Faroe Islands
Elections in the Faroe Islands
November 1945 events in Europe
Election and referendum articles with incomplete results